Saparmyrat Türkmenbaşy  is a town and capital of Saparmyrat Türkmenbaşy District in the Daşoguz Province of  Turkmenistan.

It has been assigned as an urban-type settlement since 1984. Before 1993, its name was Oktyabrsk. It is renamed to Saparmyrat Türkmenbaşy in honor of Saparmurat Niyazov.

The city has a railway station, which is the terminal on the dead-end branch of a railway line connecting Dashoguz and Xo‘jayli.

The status of the city has been assigned since 2016.

Its 1989 population is 6,770.

References

Populated places in Daşoguz Region